Gregory Erdstein is an Australian film director and writer, best known for the indie comedy That's Not Me.

Career 
Erdstein is a graduate of the Victorian College of the Arts, School of Film & TV, Melbourne, Australia.

Erdstein has collaborated with his wife, actress/writer Alice Foulcher, on several films including the controversial short film Picking up at Auschwitz, the Tropfest finalist short A Bit Rich and Paris Syndrome. They spent most of 2014 as artists in residence at the Cité internationale des arts in Paris, France, where they made Paris Syndrome, and co-wrote the screenplay for their first feature film, That's Not Me.

In 2014 also co-wrote and co-directed the short film Two Devils, with Van Diemen's Land director Jonathan auf der Heide. It premiered at the 2014 Melbourne International Film Festival.

In 2015 Erdstein commenced production on his debut feature, That's Not Me, which filmed in Melbourne, Australia and Los Angeles, USA. The film will had its World Premiere in February 2017 at the Santa Barbara International Film Festival, and Australian Premiere in June 2017 at the Sydney Film Festival - where it came Fourth at the Foxtel Movies Audience Awards. That's Not Me has been met with overwhelmingly positive reviews and a Rotten Tomatoes approval rating of 87%. The Guardian ranked it #5 of the Top 10 Australian Films of 2017, with critic Luke Buckmaster giving it a 4 star review. Andy Howell of Ain't It Cool praised Foulcher's lead performance, writing: "[Alice Foulcher] shoulders all the drama and gives one of the best twin performances I’ve ever seen... Having nuanced drama embedded in a comedy is a tightrope walk, but she’s got the skills to land it." The film was also flagged by the Santa Barbara Independent as a Must-See movie of the Santa Barbara International Film Festival, and sold out a number of sessions at the festival. Junkee Media called the film "An emotionally resonant and comedic quarter life crisis… It’s a simple set-up delivered endlessly in comedy, but managed so well in That's Not Me that you remember how rare it is that balance is achieved in Australian films." The Sydney Arts Guide praised the film and performances, writing: "There’s not a dud note in That's Not Me thanks to a solid foundation in a script by Alice Foulcher and Gregory Erdstein, and anchored by a winning lead performance by Foulcher and helmed with an assured hand by Erdstein. The support casting is impeccable…Isabel Lucas is ferociously good". Jake Watt of Switch called the film "a marvel of indie ingenuity, with dollops of charm and confident direction." Karl Quinn writing for The Age said the film is "bursting with comedy, humanity and interesting ideas", the Huffington Post called it "a stunning exploration of identity, the industry and the thirst for fame…the perfect blend of comedy and tragedy", whilst Concrete Playground praised it as "earnest, astute, insightful and thoroughly amusing. This is a movie that is both universal and unmistakably Australian – and that’s just one of many delicate balancing acts that That’s Not Me achieves". That's Not Me won the award for Best Film Under $200k at the inaugural 2018 Ozflix Independent Film Awards.

Filmography

References

External links 
 

Australian film directors
Australian writers
Living people
Year of birth missing (living people)